Taneyevka , rural localities in Russia, may refer to:

 Taneyevka, Bashkortostan, a selo
 Taneyevka, Kursk Oblast, a khutor
 Taneyevka, Lipetsk Oblast, a village
 Taneyevka, Mordovia, a village
 Taneyevka, Oryol Oblast, a village
 Taneyevka, Luninsky District, Penza Oblast, a selo
 Taneyevka, Penzensky District, Penza Oblast, a village

See also
 Taneyev